The 2011 Football Federation South Australia season was the 105th season of soccer in South Australia, and the sixth under the FFSA format.

2011 FFSA Super League

The 2011 South Australian Super League was the sixth edition of the FFSA Super League, the top level domestic association football competition in South Australia. 10 teams competed, all playing each other twice for a total of 18 rounds, with the top five at the end of the year qualifying for the McIntyre final five finals system to determine 1st to 5th place. At the end of the season, the bottom two placed teams were relegated to the 2012 FFSA Premier League.

League table

Finals

2011 FFSA Premier League

The 2011 FFSA Premier League was the sixth edition of the FFSA Premier League as the second level domestic association football competition in South Australia. 10 teams competed, all playing each other twice for a total of 18 rounds, with the top five at the end of the year qualifying for the McIntyre final five finals system to determine 1st to 5th place. The League winners and Grand Final winners were promoted to the 2012 FFSA Super League, and the 9th and 10th placed teams were relegated to the 2012 FFSA State League.

League table

Finals

2011 FFSA State League

The 2011 FFSA State League was the sixth edition of the FFSA State League as the third level domestic association football competition in South Australia. 10 teams competed, all playing each other twice for a total of 18 rounds, with the top five at the end of the year qualifying for the McIntyre final five finals system to determine 1st to 5th place. The League winners and Grand Final winners were promoted to the 2012 FFSA Premier League.

League table

Finals

2011 Women's Premier League

The highest tier domestic football competition in South Australia for women was known for sponsorship reasons as the Adelaide Airport Women's Premier League. The 7 teams played a triple round-robin for a total of 18 games.

See also
2011 FFSA Premier League
2011 FFSA Super League
2011 FFSA State League
National Premier Leagues South Australia
Football Federation South Australia

References

2011 in Australian soccer
Football South Australia seasons